Margaret of Bavaria (1442–1479), was a Marchioness consort of Mantua, married in 1463 to Federico I Gonzaga, Marquess of Mantua.  She was regent in the absence of her spouse during his military campaign in 1479.

Life
She was the daughter of Albert III, Duke of Bavaria and Anna of Brunswick-Grubenhagen-Einbeck. The marriage between Margaret and Frederico helped trading relations between the two states. 

Margaret was hunch-backed and was not able to speak or read Italian when she arrived, but the relationship with Frederico was described as happy. The court was dominated by her mother-in-law, but Margaret avoided all conflicts. 

During his war against Aragon, Frederico appointed Margaret as regent in his absence during the spring and summer of 1479. 

She died during her reign.

Issue
 Clara Gonzaga {1464-1503} married in 1482 to Gilbert of Bourbon-Montpensier Duke of Sessa; parents of Charles III, Duke of Bourbon.
 Francesco II Gonzaga (1466-1519) married in 1490 to Isabella d'Este; parents in law of Francesco Maria I della Rovere Duke of Urbino and nephew of Guidobaldo da Montefeltro
 Sigismondo Gonzaga (1469–1525)
 Elisabetta Gonzaga (1471–1526) married in 1489  to Guidobaldo da Montefeltro Duke of Urbino
 Maddelena (1472–90) married in 1489 to Giovanni Sforza Lord of Pesaro and Gradara who later married Lucrezia Borgia.
 Giovanni Gonzaga (1474–1525) married in 1493 Laura Bentivoglio (d.1523) and had issue.

Ancestors

References

1442 births
1479 deaths
15th-century women rulers
Regents of Mantua
Royalty and nobility with disabilities
Daughters of monarchs